Neon is the fourth studio album by American progressive metalcore band Erra. It was released on August 10, 2018 through Sumerian Records. The album was produced by Beau Burchell and Taylor Larson. It is the band's first album with bassist Conor Hesse and their last release to be published on this label before the band signed to UNFD in 2020.

Track listing

Personnel
Credits retrieved from AllMusic.
Erra
 J.T. Cavey – unclean vocals, backing clean vocals
 Jesse Cash – guitar, clean vocals
 Sean Price – guitar
 Conor Hesse – bass
 Alex Ballew – drums, vocal engineering

Additional personnel
 Beau Burchell – production, engineering, recording
 Taylor Larson – production, mastering, mixing
 John Maciel – assistant engineering
 Andrew Jarrin, Cory Hajde and Jason Mageau – management
 Mete Yafet – artwork
 Nick Walters – A&R
 Daniel McBride – layout

Charts

References

2018 albums
Erra (band) albums
Sumerian Records albums